Agrotis alexandriensis is a moth of the family Noctuidae. It is found in the coastal dunes and saline deserts along the shores of the Mediterranean Sea from Tunisia to Egypt. It was also recorded from the sand dunes of the Southern Coastal Plain in Israel.
A. alexandriensis is grey with the lines and stigmata dark and distinct

Adults are on wing in October, November and/or April depending on the location. There are two generations per year.

External links
 Noctuinae of Israel

Agrotis
Moths of Africa
Moths of the Middle East
Moths described in 1894